Lili Golestan Taghavi Shirazi (born 14 July 1944 in Tehran) is an Iranian translator, and owner and artistic director of the Golestan Gallery in Tehran.  She is the daughter of the filmmaker and writer Ebrahim Golestan, the sister of the late photojournalist Kaveh Golestan and the mother of filmmaker Mani Haghighi. She spent a number of her formative years in Abadan, where her father worked as a filmmaker.

Translations
 How Babies are Made, Andrew Andry
 Life, War and Nothing Else, Oriana Fallaci
 The Strange Story of Spermato…
 Story Number 3, Eugène Ionesco
 Mira, Christopher Frank
 Tistou of the Green Thumbs, Maurice Druon
 Two Plays from Ancient China
 Chronicle of a Death Foretold, Gabriel Garcia Marquez
 The Man Who Had Everything, Everything, Everything, Miguel Angel Asturias
 The Fragrance of Guava, Gabriel Garcia Marquez
 Hellenism, Yiannis Ritsos
 Citizen Pigeon, Romain Gary 
 Stories and Myths, Leonardo da Vinci
 Ondine, Jean Giraudoux
 If on a Winter's Night a Traveler, Italo Calvino
 The Story of My Condition Now, a long interview with Ahmad Mahmoud
 Six Memos for the Next Millenium, Italo Calvino
 A two volume book about Ali Hatami and his works
 Interview with Marcel Duchamp	Pierre Cabanne
 About Colours, Wittgenstein
 Life with Picasso, Françoise Gilot
 Picasso, David Hockney
 Mark Rothko, Sean Scully
 Van Gogh, Gauguin
 Marcel Duchamp speaks about Readymades

Author
 Majmooaye Honarhaye Tajasomi Moaser

References

External links
 
 A photo of her in Golestan Gallery

1944 births
Iranian translators
Living people
Iranian Writers Association members